John Dominis Holt IV (June 4, 1919 – March 29, 1993) was a Native Hawaiian writer, poet and cultural historian. In 1979, he was recognized as a Living Treasures of Hawaiʻi for his contribution to the Hawaiian Renaissance.

Family
He was born June 4, 1919, in Honolulu, to John Dominis Holt III (1885–1950) and May Ellen Bailey (1892–1975). His paternal grandfather was Colonel John Dominis Holt II, an officer of King Kalākaua and Queen Liliuokalani's military staff. From his mother, he descended from Hawaiian missionary and artist Edward Bailey. Holt was of mixed Native Hawaiian, Tahitian and English descent, known as a hapa haole in Hawaiian. According to family tradition, his ancestors included Hawaiian and Tahitian royalty, Lucien Bonaparte, the younger brother of French Emperor Napoleon, and British Admiral Lord George Paulet. By the time of his generation, the wealth and social standing of the family were long gone; but he spent his youth surrounded by older generations who loved to tell their memories of the monarchy. These traditional stories inspired his later writing as an adult.

Literary career
Holt was educated Punahou School (briefly), Kamehameha Schools and graduated from President Theodore Roosevelt High School in Honolulu, In college, he attended Sacramento Junior College in Sacramento, George Washington University in Washington, DC, and from 1943 to 1946 he attended Columbia University but never acquired a degree. His first marriage was to Fredda M. deVere Burwell, an artist from New York. He lived in New York for some time before returning to Hawaii with his wife. After Fredda's death in 1972, he remarried to Frances Patches McKinnon Damon, a granddaughter of Samuel Mills Damon. They adopted three children: Allison, Melanie, and Daniel. He worked as a landscape designer and contractor.

Holt is known mainly for his literary work. He wrote many books on the subject of Hawaiian history and culture. His works include writings about Hawaiian featherwork, family heritage and genealogy. The spirit of old Hawaii that he learned from family traditions and childhood tales of the monarchy became incorporated into the stories he wrote as an adult. In 1964, his essay "On Being Hawaiian" inspired the rise of the Second Hawaiian Renaissance movement. Holt brought pride back to the Hawaiian self-identity after decades of shame and negative stereotypes. Through his writings, Hawaii saw a revival in traditional Hawaiian culture, art and language. Below is an excerpt from this essay:

Holt worked as a publisher for Topgallant Publishing Company and was a trustee for the Bernice Pauahi Bishop Museum. He was one of the earliest contemporary Hawaiian novelists. He and his second wife Patches worked as activists in the Hawaiian community, fighting against rapid development on the island of Oahu. They were also patrons of the arts. In 1979, he was recognized as a Living Treasures of Hawaiʻi. In 1985, Holt was awarded the Hawai‘i Award for Literature by Governor John David Waiheʻe III.

Holt died on March 29, 1993. He was buried in Oahu Cemetery in Honolulu. The John Dominis Holt Award for Excellence in Publishing, named in his honor, is awarded annually by Hawaii Book Publishers Association to an individual for their lifetime contribution to Hawaiian literature and book-publishing. In 2001, John Dominis and Patches Damon Holt Gallery at the Honolulu Academy of Arts was named after Holt and his second wife.

Works 

Missing third edition

References

Bibliography

1919 births
1993 deaths
Native Hawaiian writers
Historians of Hawaii
Native Hawaiian culture
Native Hawaiian people
Columbia University alumni
Sacramento City College alumni
George Washington University alumni
Punahou School alumni
Kamehameha Schools alumni
President Theodore Roosevelt High School alumni
Poets from Hawaii
American people of French Polynesian descent
American people of English descent
Burials at Oahu Cemetery
Writers from Hawaii